Rumpus in the Harem is a 1956 short subject directed by Jules White starring American slapstick comedy team The Three Stooges (Moe Howard, Larry Fine and Shemp Howard). It is the 171st entry in the series released by Columbia Pictures starring the comedians, who appeared in 190 shorts for the studio between 1934 and 1959.

Plot
The Stooges play the proprietors of the Cafe Casbah Bah, a Middle Eastern restaurant. One morning, Moe and Larry are awakened by their crying sweethearts, who are in need of money to pay off a bad debt. While attempting to prepare a meal for customers Hassan Ben Sober (Vernon Dent) and the Gin of Rummy (George J. Lewis), the Stooges try to think of a way to raise the needed cash. In the interim, they discover a plan that their hungry customers are hatching. These two thieves are attempting to rob the tomb of Rootentooten, which contains a priceless diamond, but they discover that the Emir of Schmow (Johnny Kascier) has already gotten his hands on the diamond. The two plotters start wailing and are thrown out of the restaurant. The Stooges then attempt to retrieve the diamond themselves, as there is a $50,000 reward at stake.

The Stooges arrive at the Emir of Shmow's palace, all three dressed as Santa Claus. They then manage to acquire the diamond and make a quick exit, but not before dealing with a burly guard.

Cast

Credited
 Moe Howard as Moe
 Larry Fine as Larry
 Shemp Howard as Shemp (stock footage)
 Joe Palma as Shemp(new footage) (seen from the back) (uncredited)
 Vernon Dent as Hassan Ben Sober (stock footage)
 George J. Lewis as Ginna Rumma (stock footage)

Uncredited
 Frank Lackteen as Haffa Dalla (stock footage)
 Johnny Kascier as Emir of Schmow (stock footage)
 Everett Brown as Nubian Guard (stock footage)
 Ruth Godfrey, Diana Darrin and Helen Jay as the Stooges' Girlfriends
 Harriette Tarler and Suzanne Ridgeway as Harem Girls
 Jerome Johnson and Alfred Johnson as Nubian Guards
 Jock Mahoney as the gunman in the bar

Production notes
Rumpus in the Harem is a remake of 1949's Malice in the Palace, using ample stock footage. It was the first of four shorts filmed in the wake of Shemp Howard's November 1955 death using earlier footage and a stand-in: all new footage was shot on January 10, 1956.

"Fake Shemp"

As Shemp Howard had already died, for these last four films (Rumpus in the Harem, Hot Stuff, Scheming Schemers and Commotion on the Ocean), Columbia utilized supporting actor Joe Palma to be Shemp's double. Even though the last four shorts were remakes of earlier Shemp efforts, Palma's services were needed to film new scenes in order to link existing stock footage.

For Rumpus in the Harem, Palma is seen from the back several times. The first time occurs in the restaurant when Moe declares that the trio must do something to help their sweethearts. Larry then concludes the conversation by saying "I've got it, I've got it!" Moe inquires with "What?" Larry replies, "a terrific headache!" Later, Palma is seen from the back being chased in circles by the palace guard. A few lines of dialogue appear — "Whoa, Moe, Larry! Moe, help!" — by dubbing Shemp's voice from the soundtracks of Fuelin' Around and Blunder Boys. Palma also appears from the side with Moe and Larry in a promo photo looking up at the two Harem girls. As Palma was the farthest from the camera, half his face was allowed to be seen. Palma is seen one final time, making a mad dash for the open window, and supplying his own yell before making the final jump. This was one of the few times during his tenure as Shemp's double that Palma was required to speak without the aid of dubbing.

See also
List of American films of 1956

References

External links 
 
 
Rumpus in the Harem at threestooges.net
What is a Fake Shemp?

1956 films
1956 comedy films
The Three Stooges films
American black-and-white films
The Three Stooges film remakes
Films directed by Jules White
Columbia Pictures short films
1950s English-language films
1950s American films
American comedy short films